Anos (Onos) is a rural locality (a selo) and the administrative centre of Anosinskoye Rural Settlement of Chemalsky District, the Altai Republic, Russia. The population was 349 as of 2016. There are 10 streets.

Geography 
Anos is located in the valley of the Katun River, south from Gorno-Altaysk, 13 km north of Chemal (the district's administrative centre) by road. Uznezya is the nearest rural locality.

References 

Rural localities in Chemalsky District